Korosi is a shield volcano located in the Gregory Rift at the northern end of Lake Baringo, Kenya.

See also
 List of volcanoes in Kenya

References 
 

Korosi
Korosi
Korosiol